The 1912 Australasian Championships was a tennis tournament that took place on outdoor grass courts at Hastings, New Zealand from 30 December 1912 until 1 January 1913. It was the 8th edition of the Australian Championships (now known as the Australian Open), the first held in Hastings, the second held in New Zealand, after Christchurch in 1906, and the third Grand Slam tournament of the year. Travel by sea was slow, limiting the attendance of Australian players, and New Zealand player Anthony Wilding did not return from Europe. The singles title was won by Irish James Cecil Parke.

Finals

Men's singles

 James Cecil Parke defeated  Alfred Beamish  3–6, 6–3, 1–6, 6–1, 7–5

Men's doubles
 Charles Dixon /  James Cecil Parke defeated  Alfred Beamish /  Gordon Lowe 6–4, 6–4, 6–2

References

External links
 Australian Open official website

 
1912 in tennis
Sport in Hastings, New Zealand
1912 in New Zealand sport
1912
December 1912 sports events
January 1913 sports events